Federal Route 104, or Jalan Teluk Ewa, is a major federal road in Langkawi Island, Kedah, Malaysia.

Features
Lafarge Malayan Cement Langkawi Plant
Lafarge Jetty
Teluk Ewa Power Station

At most sections, the Federal Route 104 was built under the JKR R5 road standard, allowing maximum speed limit of up to 90 km/h.

List of junctions and town

References

Malaysian Federal Roads
Roads in Langkawi